Filip Kaša (born 1 January 1994) is a Czech football player who currently plays for Viktoria Plzeň as a centre-back.

Club career

MŠK Žilina
For over three years, Kaša had played for Žilina. He was released as Žilina had entered liquidation due to the coronavirus pandemic. He had won the Fortuna Liga with the team once.

Viktoria Plzeň
On 6 May 2020 it had been announced that Káčer had signed for Viktoria Plzeň, along with Miroslav Káčer, who was also released from Žilina. They had re-joined their former coach from the Slovak club, Adrián Guľa, under whom they had won the Slovak Fortuna Liga in the 2016–17 season. The terms of his agreement with Viktoria were not announced.

International career
He had played international football at under-21 level for Czech Republic U21.

He made his debut for the Czech Republic national football team on 5 September 2021 in a World Cup qualifier against Belgium, a 0–3 away loss. He started the game and played the whole match.

Honours

MŠK Žilina
Fortuna Liga: Winners: 2016-17

References

External links

1994 births
Living people
Czech footballers
Czech expatriate footballers
Czech Republic youth international footballers
Czech Republic under-21 international footballers
Czech Republic international footballers
Association football defenders
Sportspeople from Ostrava
Czech First League players
FC Baník Ostrava players
MŠK Žilina players
Slovak Super Liga players
FC Viktoria Plzeň players
Czech expatriate sportspeople in Slovakia
Expatriate footballers in Slovakia